Street Corner Talking is the seventh studio album by the English blues rock band Savoy Brown. Released by Parrot Records in 1971 (PAS 71047), it was the first album released after the departure of guitarist Lonesome Dave, drummer Roger Earl, and bassist Tone Stevens who all went on to form the more successful rock band Foghat. This left Kim Simmonds as the only remaining member. Simmonds recruited a new line-up of members, predominantly members of the previous line-up of the blues band Chicken Shack, which had undergone a seismic change in membership similar to that which had affected Savoy Brown, which, in turn, ushered in a new sound for the band.

Track listing

Side one
 "Tell Mama" (Paul Raymond, Kim Simmonds) – 5:15
 "I Can't Get Next To You" (Barrett Strong, Norman Whitfield) – 6:35
 "Let It Rock" (Raymond, Simmonds) – 3:07
 "Time Does Tell" (Simmonds) – 5:29

Side two
 "Street Corner Talking" (Simmonds) – 4:00
 "All I Can Do" (Raymond, Simmonds) – 10:54
 "Wang Dang Doodle" (Willie Dixon) – 7:15

Bonus track on 1991 CD reissue
"Tell Mama" (Raymond, Simmonds) – 3:07 (single version)

Personnel

Savoy Brown
 Dave Walker – vocals
 Kim Simmonds – lead guitar
 Paul Raymond – keyboards; guitar (track 1); vocals (track 3)
 Andy Silvester – bass guitar
 Dave Bidwell – drums

Production
 Neil Slaven – producer
 George Chkiantz – engineer
 Rod Thear – assistant engineer
 Sam Feldman – mastering (side two of original issue)
 Anthony Hawkins – remastering (1991 CD)
 John Tracy – liner notes, coordination, compilation, research (CD)
 David Anstey – cover illustration

Charts

References

External links
Savoy Brown's Homepage

1971 albums
Savoy Brown albums
Decca Records albums
Albums recorded at Olympic Sound Studios